Edgaras Utkus (born 22 June 2000) is a Lithuanian professional footballer who plays as a midfielder for  Cercle Brugge and the Lithuania national team.

Career

Monaco
In 2019, Utkus signed his first professional contract with Monaco. In France he played from summer of the 2019. He appeared for the reserves, competing in Championnat National 2.

Cercle Brugge
In the summer of 2021, Utkus moved to Belgian First Division A club Cercle Brugge. He made his debut on 24 July 2021 in a match against Beerschot which was interrupted after 55 minutes due to heavy rainfall. The match was continued on 27 July, and ended in a 1–0 win for Cercle. Despite being a midfielder, Utkus lined up in the right side of central defense, where he kept a clean sheet.

International career
Utkus made his international debut for the Lithuania national team on 11 November 2020 in a friendly match against the Faroe Islands.

Career statistics

International

References

External links
 
 

2000 births
Living people
Footballers from Vilnius
Lithuanian footballers
Association football midfielders
Lithuania youth international footballers
Lithuania under-21 international footballers
Lithuania international footballers
Cercle Brugge K.S.V. players
Championnat National 2 players
AS Monaco FC players
Belgian Pro League players
Lithuanian expatriate footballers
Expatriate sportspeople in Monaco
Expatriate footballers in Monaco
Lithuanian expatriate sportspeople in France
Expatriate footballers in France
Lithuanian expatriate sportspeople in Belgium
Expatriate footballers in Belgium